Ryan Hansen Solves Crimes on Television is an action comedy series created by Rawson Marshall Thurber and starring Ryan Hansen that premiered on October 25, 2017, on YouTube Red (now YouTube Premium). In July 2018, it was announced that the series had been renewed for a second season which premiered on January 30, 2019.

On April 10, 2019, YouTube canceled the series.

Premise
Ryan Hansen Solves Crimes on Television is "set in a world  where the LAPD thinks it’s a good idea to form a task force partnering actors with homicide detectives to take advantage of their “actor skills” and industry connections to help solve murders."

Cast and characters

Main
 Ryan Hansen as himself

Recurring
 Samira Wiley as Jessica Mathers
 Aly Michalka as Amy
 Wood Harris as Vince Vincente
 Evangeline Lindes as Crosby
 Noelle E Parker as Millie
 Jon Cryer as himself
 Sydney Brower as Everett
 Karen David as Priya
 Eric Christian Olsen as himself
 Barry Shabaka Henley as Captain Jackson #3 and #8
 Jessica St. Clair as Captain Lade'e
 Joel McHale as himself
 Donald Faison as himself

Guest

 James McDaniel as Captain Jackson #1 ("Pilot")
 Steve Harris as Captain Jackson #2 ("Jane D'Oh!")
 Leslie David Baker as Captain Jackson #4 ("Trafficking and the Traffic King")
 Frankie Faison as Captain Jackson #5 ("Hungry for Justice")
 Mary Birdsong as Dorothy Montclair ("Hungry for Justice")
 Arielle Vandenberg as herself ("Joel McHale Is: Ryan Hansen")
 Yvette Nicole Brown as Captain Jackson #7 ("Freezed")
 Kristen Bell as herself ("Freezed")
 Peter Berg as himself ("Eight Is the New Se7en")
 Ken Marino as himself ("The Office Party")
 Amanda Cerny as herself ("Like and Subscribe")
 Jillian Bell as herself ("The Ry Chromosome")
 Lucy Hale as herself ("The Ry Chromosome")
 Rob Corddry as himself ("For Your Inconsideration")
 Jane Lynch as herself ("For Your Inconsideration")
 Ben Schwartz as himself ("Execution Dependent")
 Dax Shepard as himself ("Execution Dependent")

Episodes

Season 1 (2017)

Season 2 (2019)

Production

Development
On June 22, 2017, it was announced that YouTube had given the production a series order for a first season consisting of eight episodes. The series was created by director Rawson Marshall Thurber who was set to executive produce alongside Scott Stuber, Beau Bauman, Krysia Plonka and Tracey Baird. Ryan Hansen was expected to serve as a producer. On July 27, 2018, it was announced that the series had been renewed for a second season expected to premiere in 2019. On December 17, 2018, it was announced that season two would premiere on January 30, 2019.

Casting
Alongside the series order announcement, it was confirmed that the series would star Ryan Hansen with guest stars including Joel McHale, Jon Cryer, and Kristen Bell, among others.

Filming
Principal photography for season two began on July 26, 2018 in Los Angeles, California.

Reception
Ryan Hansen Solves Crimes on Television has received mixed reviews from critics at launch. On Metacritic, which assigns a normalized rating to reviews, the series has a weighted average score of 56 out of 100, based on 5 critics, indicating "mixed or average reviews". Mike Hale of The New York Times said in a mixed review, "Solves Crimes has potential, but its problem is hard-wired into its premise and its venue: You wish that someone more interesting to watch than Mr. Hansen were at the center of it. There’s no compelling reason to watch, but you might get a kick out of it." Dan Fienberg of The Hollywood Reporter commented that the show is "bloated and sloppy and amateurish in a way that occasionally rises to the level of 'gleeful,' but it's occasionally hilarious and delivers a much more scathing, granular and detailed satire of the television business and Hollywood fame than the facile yuks of Showtime's departed, overpraised Episodes."

References

External links
 Official YouTube Channel
 

2017 American television series debuts
2019 American television series endings
2010s American comedy television series
English-language television shows
YouTube Premium original series